The 2013–14 Green Bay Phoenix men's basketball team represented the University of Wisconsin–Green Bay in the 2013–14 NCAA Division I men's basketball season. Their head coach was fourth year coach Brian Wardle. The Phoenix played their home games at the Resch Center and were members of the Horizon League. They finished the season 24–7, 14–2 in Horizon League play to claim the Horizon League regular season championship. They lost in the semifinals of the Horizon League tournament to Milwaukee. As a regular season conference champion who failed to win their conference tournament, they received an automatic bid to the National Invitation Tournament where the lost in the first round to Belmont.

Roster

Schedule

|-
!colspan=9 style="background:#006633; color:#FFFFFF;"|  Regular season

 
 
 

  
  
 
 
 
 
 
|-
!colspan=9 style="background:#006633; color:#FFFFFF;"| Horizon League tournament

|-
!colspan=9 style="background:#006633; color:#FFFFFF;"| NIT

Green Bay Phoenix
Green Bay Phoenix men's basketball seasons
Green Bay
Wiscon
Wiscon